WJRE (102.5 FM) is a radio station licensed to Galva, Illinois, with studios in Kewanee, Illinois. WJRE plays a traditional country format, with a mix of songs from the 1970s through today. WJRE is operated by Fletcher M. Ford, the President and owner of Regional Media, a Virden Broadcasting Corporation and is licensed to Galva, Illinois. Main studios are located in Kewanee, IL with a remote studio and offices in another area.

WJRE broadcasts in the HD Radio format.

History
 May 20, 1966 - WKEI-FM went on the air, providing the Tri-County area (Henry, Bureau, and Stark) with its first local FM signal at 92.1 MHz.
 March 1, 1974 - WKEI-FM became WJRE, which operated on a frequency of 92.1 MHz.
 October 1, 1996 - The frequency was changed to 93.9 MHz, with 3,100 watts of power from a 453-foot tower northeast of Kewanee, substantially increasing WJRE's coverage area.
 May 1, 2003, midnight - The frequency was changed to 102.5 MHz from a tower south of Galva, with 3,000 watts of power.
 November 3, 2005 at 4 p.m., WJRE switched to a new transmitter on Beach Street in Kewanee, sharing facilities with sister station WKEI. WJRE now operates at 6,000 watts.
 January 1, 2007 at 6 a.m., WJRE changed music format from Hot Adult Contemporary (Hot AC) to a country music format.
 February 1, 2018 at 12:01 a.m., WJRE launched "104.7 Rock 2.0", a rock music format on their HD3 channel and translator W284CV.

References

External links

JRE
Country radio stations in the United States
Radio stations established in 1966
Radio stations in the Quad Cities